Ponana is a genus of leafhoppers in  the family Cicadellidae. There are more than 100 described species in Ponana.

See also
 List of Ponana species

References

External links

 

Cicadellidae
Hemiptera genera